Statistics of Japanese Regional Leagues for the 2009 season.

Champions list

As of October 25, 2009
Club names in bold indicates clubs advance to the Regional League promotion series held in late November. Club names in italic indicates winners and runners-up of All Japan Senior Football Championship which advance to the Regional League promotion series as well.
Source:33rd Regional Football League Tournament

Hokkaido

2009 was the 32nd season of Hokkaido League. The season started on May 10 and ended on September 13.

It was contested by six teams and Sapporo University GP won the tournament.

After the season, Barefoot Hokkaido and Toyota Motor Hokkaido were relegated to the Block Leagues. They were replaced by Blackpecker Hakodate and Maruseizu FC

League table

Results

Tohoku

Division 1

2009 was the 33rd season of Tohoku League. The season started on April 12 and ended on October 11.

It was contested by eight teams and Grulla Morioka won the championship for the third consecutive year.

After the season, Sendai Nakada were relegated to the second division (south group) and Cobaltore Onagawa took their place.

League table

Results

Division 2
2009 was the 13th season of Tohoku League Division 2. North and South groups were won by Fuji Club 2003 and Cobaltore Onagawa respectively, and in post-season playoff series the latter earned promotion to Division 1.

North league table

North league results

South league table

South league results

Tohoku Promotion and Relegation Series
In order to decide the direct exchange between two divisions, two D2 winners played against each other in two-legged series. Cobaltore Onagawa defeated Fuji Club 2003 and received direct promotion to Division 1, replacing the bottom-placed Sendai Nakada, while Fuji Club 2003 were scheduled to face Shiogama Wiese in another two-legged series. By overall result, Shiogama Wiese have saved their Division 1 position.

The bottom-placed teams in both groups of Division 2 were directly relegated to the prefectural leagues, though in the north FC Shiwa have escaped relegation because of post-season disbandment of Grulla Istria. Their spots were filled by Omiya FC and Scheinen Fukushima, respectively. Second to last finishers, ReinMeer Aomori and Soma SC were scheduled to play against Hokuto Bank S.C. and Sakata Migaku Club, respectively, and both won their challenges, thus remaining in the Regional League for another year.

Kanto

Division 1

2009 was the 43rd season of Kanto League. The season started on April 4 and ended on September 6.

It was contested by eight teams and YSCC Yokohama won the championship for the second time in their history after two-year pause.

After the season, Hitachi Tochigi Uva were promoted to Japan Football League. Because of that, only Honda Luminozo Sayama were relegated to the second division, and both its winner and runner-up, Vertfee Takahara Nasu and Tonan Maebashi were promoted automatically.

League table

Results

Division 2

2009 was the 7th season of Kanto League Division 2. It was won by Vertfee Takahara Nasu who earned promotion to Division 1 along with runners-up Tonan Maebashi. On the other end of the table, Yono Shukonkai were relegated and SG System and TM & NF Insurance were promoted from prefectural leagues.

League table

Results

Hokushin'etsu

Division 1

2009 was the 35th season of Hokushin'etsu League. The season started on April 11 and ended on August 2.

It was contested by eight teams and Japan Soccer College won the championship for the third time in their history after two-year pause.

After the season, Zweigen Kanazawa and Matsumoto Yamaga were promoted to Japan Football League. Because of that, no one were relegated. Because D2 champions, CUPS Seiro, were reserve team of Japan Soccer College, the promotion was given to the runner-up and third-placed team, Antelope Shiojiri and Teihens FC respectively.

League table

Results

Division 2

2009 was the 6th season of Hokushin'etsu League Division 2. It was won by CUPS Seiro, but being a reserve team of Japan Soccer College, they were not eligible to promotion. Instead, the runner-up and the third-placed team, Antelope Shiojiri and Teihens FC respectively, were promoted.

Due to no team being relegated from D1, no relegation occurred in D2 either. After the season, Fukui KSC and Artista Tomi were promoted from Prefectural leagues.

League table

Results

Tokai

2009 season finished on October 11, 2009

2009 season finished on October 25, 2009

Kansai

2009 season finished on October 4, 2009

2009 season finished on October 4, 2009

Chugoku

2009 season finished on October 25, 2009

Shikoku

2009 season finished on October 25, 2009

Kyushu

2009 season finished on September 6, 2009

Regional promotion series

2009
4